Odette Barsa (née Matouk, 29 December 1901 – 8 January 1975) was an American lingerie designer, and the founder of the eponymous label.

Biogrpahy 
Odette Barsa was born in Syria on 29 December 1901.

In 1925, she married Simon Barsa (1888–1977), a Syrian-born businessman. After the 1929 stock market crash, her husband's business struggled, so she started making lingerie. In the 1930 census, he was described as "Manufacturer, Rugs".  They had three children, Gabriel, Albert and Nadia, all born in New York.  Over time her business grew to occupy a whole floor of 16 East 34th Street, New York City. Her designs are represented today in the holdings of the Texas Fashion Collection, the Mint Museum, and the Goldstein Museum of Design.

Barsa died in January 1975, and the business continued for some time, run by her sons.

References

1901 births
1975 deaths
American fashion designers
Lingerie brands
People from New York City
Syrian emigrants to the United States